This is a list of newspapers published in Tasmania in Australia through its history. From the founding as Van Dieman's Land, through the establishment of the Colony of Tasmania to the creation of a state of Australia as Tasmania in 1901 to the present day.

See also
 List of newspapers in Australia

References

Tasmania
 
Tasmania-related lists